Glinishchevo is a rural locality (a selo) and the administrative center of Bryansky District, Bryansk Oblast, Russia. Population:

References

Notes

Sources

Rural localities in Bryansky District